Sobralia setigera, is a species of orchid native to Peru, with snow-white flowers that are about  long.

References 

setigera
Flora of Peru